Events in the year 1906 in Brazil.

Incumbents

Federal government
President: Francisco de Paula Rodrigues Alves (till 14 November); Afonso Pena (from 15 November)
Vice President: Afonso Pena (till 14 November); Nilo Peçanha (from 15 November)

Governors 
 Alagoas: Antônio Máximo da Cunha Rego (till 12 June); Euclid Vieira Malta (from 12 June)
 Amazonas: Antônio Constantino Néri 
 Bahia: José Marcelino de Sousa
 Ceará: Antônio Nogueira Accioli
 Goiás: Miguel da Rocha Lima
 Maranhão: Manuel Lopes da Cunha (till 1 March); Benedito Pereira Leite (from 1 March)
 Mato Grosso: Antônio Pais de Barros, then Pedro Leite Osório
 Minas Gerais: Francisco Salles (till 7 September); João Pinheiro da Silva (from 7 September)
 Pará: Augusto Montenegro
 Paraíba: Valfredo Leal
 Paraná: Vicente Machado da Silva Lima; João Cândido Ferreira
 Pernambuco: Sigismundo Antônio Gonçalves
 Piauí: Álvaro de Assis Osório Mendes
 Rio Grande do Norte: Augusto Tavares Lira (till 5 November); Manuel Moreira Dias (from 5 November)
 Rio Grande do Sul: Antônio Augusto Borges de Medeiros
 Santa Catarina:
 São Paulo: 
 Sergipe:

Vice governors 
 Rio Grande do Norte:
 São Paulo:

Events
21 January - The Brazilian battleship Aquidabã sinks, after its powder magazines explode near the Jacuacanga strait, in Angra dos Reis bay.  A total of 212 people are killed, including three admirals and most of the ship's officers; 98 survive.
1 March - In the presidential election, Afonso Pena of the Mineiro Republican Party receives 97.9% of the vote.  
5 May - The Treaty of Limits between Brazil and the Netherlands is signed in Rio de Janeiro, establishing the international boundary between Brazil and the Dutch colony of Suriname.
9 November - The Brazilian Flag Anthem ("Hino à Bandeira Nacional"), with lyrics by Olavo Bilac and music by Francisco Braga, is performed for the first time.

Births
27 January - Radamés Gnattali, conductor and composer (died 1988)
23 June - Lima Barreto, film director and screenwriter (died 1982) 
30 July - Mário Quintana, writer and translator (died 1994)
14 September - Flávio Costa, football player and manager (died 1999)

Deaths
7 October - Domingos Olímpio, novelist (born 1851)

References

See also 
1906 in Brazilian football

 
1900s in Brazil
Years of the 20th century in Brazil
Brazil
Brazil